ProMT is a developer of language translation software for businesses and private users since 1991. The company provides on-premises software based on neural technologies.

History
On March 6, 1998, ProMT launched a free online translation services, which is now known as PROMT.One. 

In 1997, ProMT and the French company Softissimo developed a line of products for the European company Reverso.

Technology
Historically, ProMT systems used rule-based machine translation (RBMT) technology. In 2011 a hybrid approach which combined rule-based and statistical MT was implemented.

In 2019, ProMT introduced its new neural technology  and flagship solution - PROMT Neural Translation Server. Since then all MT systems developed by ProMT are based on neural machine translation.

The software can run on Microsoft Windows, Linux, MacOS, iOS and Android and works in offline mode providing secure machine translation.

As of 2022, it translates 45 languages from and to English, German, and Russian.

See also
Comparison of machine translation applications
DeepL Translator 
Babylon
Google Translate
Systran
vidby
Yandex.Translate

References

Companies based in Saint Petersburg
Software companies established in 1991
Russian brands
Software companies of Russia
Russian companies established in 1991
Translation websites
Machine translation